Ali Alam is a Pakistani underground musician based in Karachi. An architect by profession, he graduated from Sri Ara Schools, Malaysia.

Biography

Birth
Ali was born on September 11, 1977. According to sources, there was no electricity in the entire city of Lahore that night; as such, Ali was born with lanterns placed in the maternity ward.

Childhood
Ali comes from a family involved with showbiz. His cousin, Bilal Maqsood, son of veteran comedian and writer Anwer Maqsood, was a frequent visitor at the residential apartment complex where Ali resided for most of his childhood and teen years. Ali was famed for having the largest collection of music cassettes in the entire neighborhood. He was strumming the guitar very early on in his life. Many joked that Ali was taking after Bilal, the latter being a successful guitar lead for the popular band Strings and a student at Indus Valley School of Art in the 1990s.

Ganda Banda and the 3 Dead Cats
'Ganda Banda & the 3 Dead Cats' was formed while studying in Indus. Ali along with his friends Babar Sheikh, Ahmed and Rizwan started performing in local events and restaurants. They became popular in the underground circuit with more than 100 shows to their record. 
The Band recorded a rough-cut live studio version in Sonic Studios Karachi. The album was titled 'Live! 2.5 km from the Tower'. It was later released online in 2006 on the website Raw.com.pk
The band disbanded in 2004 with bitter creative indifferences, vowed never to get back again. Their departure was marked by a farewell video 'Tu Na Ho Meray Paas' directed by Umair Tareen, of Razam fame.

According to Babar Sheikh, ex-band member, Ali was always the main brain of Ganda Banda & The 3D Cats. Songs like 'Tu Na Ho Meray Pass' and 'Dhoondha Taaron Mein' that have achieved "cult" status today were all Ali's creations.

Ali Alam and his solo years
After Ganda Banda, Ali tried to go solo by recording 'Raat Jaagi' in Mekaal Hasan's Digital Fidelity Studios in Lahore. The track also featured Gumby on drums. The track was released online and became popular through many music websites. A low-budget video of the track was shot & directed by Bilal Maqsood. The video was highly successful and went to no.6 on the MTV Indian charts on Indus Music.

To make ends meet, Ali recorded 'Kachwa Bachao' for an animal foundation. It got popular among children, only those who appeared in the video.

Ali Alam and his A.D.P. years
In 2007, Ali started performing alongside the 'Aunty Disco Project' to make a comeback.

References

External links
 Official Website
 Ganda Banda & 3D Cats Website
 Ganda Banda Gallery

Pakistani guitarists
Pakistani composers
Living people
1977 births
Pakistani architects
Indus Valley School of Art and Architecture alumni
Musicians from Lahore
Musicians from Karachi
Architects from Karachi
Architects from Lahore
21st-century guitarists